Hallvard Lillehammer is a professor of philosophy at Birkbeck College, University of London. His research relates to "the interpretation and criticism of basic ideas in contemporary moral and political thought, including reason, objectivity, impartiality, autonomy, and detachment." He formerly taught at the Faculty of Philosophy, University of Cambridge, where he was a Fellow of King's College from 2000 to 2009 and a Senior Research Fellow of Churchill College from 2010 to 2013. He was educated at University College London and Peterhouse, Cambridge. Of Norwegian, German and Swedish descent, Lillehammer was born in Bergen and grew up in Stavanger, Norway. He is married to Alejandra Peña Lesmes, who is a native of the Spanish autonomous city of Ceuta.

Selected publications
‘Smith on Moral Fetishism.’ Analysis 57:3, 187-95., 1997.
'Moral Realism, Normative Reasons and Rational Intelligibility', Erkenntnis, 2002.
'Debunking Morality: Evolutionary Naturalism and Moral Error Theory', Biology and Philosophy, 2003.
'Moral Error Theory', Proceedings of the Aristotelian Society, 2004.
Companions in Guilt: Arguments for Ethical Objectivity. Palgrave Macmillan. 2007.
'Methods of Ethics and the Descent of Man: Darwin and Sidgwick on Ethics and Evolution', Biology and Philosophy, 2010.
‘Who Is My Neighbour? Understanding Indifference as a Vice’, Philosophy, 2014.
‘Minding Your Own Business? Understanding Indifference as a Virtue’, Philosophical Perspectives, 2014.
‘Moral Testimony, Moral Virtue and the Value of Autonomy’, Proceedings of the Aristotelian Society, Supplementary Volume, 2014.
'The Nature and Ethics of Indifference', The Journal of Ethics, 2017.
'Moral Luck and Moral Performance', European Journal of Philosophy, 2020.

References

External links 
http://hallvardlillehammer.com

Living people
Year of birth missing (living people)
English philosophers
Academics of Birkbeck, University of London
Academics of the University of Cambridge
Alumni of University College London
Alumni of the University of Cambridge